Kim Tae-hyoung (Korean: 김태형; born September 12, 1967) is a South Korean professional baseball manager and former player. As manager of the Doosan Bears, he led the team into seven consecutive Korean Series appearances between 2015 and 2021, and won the championship on three occasions.

Kim played as catcher for the fourth-placed South Korean national team in the 1988 Summer Olympics. He spent twelve seasons in the KBO League, from 1990 to 2001, all for the Bears. After his retirement, he stayed on as a coach for the Bears for an additional eleven seasons. After three seasons coaching the SK Wyverns, Kim was brought back to the Bears, this time as the team's manager, in 2015.

References

External links
Career statistics and player information at the KBO League official website 

Kim Tae-hyoung at Doosan Bears Baseball Club 

1967 births
Living people
Baseball players from Seoul
Doosan Bears managers
Doosan Bears coaches
SSG Landers coaches
Doosan Bears players
South Korean baseball players
South Korean baseball coaches
South Korean baseball managers
KBO League catchers
Baseball players at the 1988 Summer Olympics
Olympic baseball players of South Korea
Dankook University alumni